Virtus Francavilla Calcio, commonly known as Virtus Francavilla, is an Italian football club based in Francavilla Fontana, Apulia. They currently play in Serie C, the third tier of Italian football.

History

The historic Francavilla Calcio 
The historic Francavilla Calcio was founded in 1946 with the name of A.S. Francavilla, and it has always played regional leagues. In 2006 it was renamed A.S.D. Francavilla Calcio In the season 2010–11, was relegated from Serie D group H  to the Eccellenza Apulia.

Foundation 
The new club was founded in 2007 under the name of Salento Francavilla. It has assumed its present name after the merger at the end of the 2013/2014 season with the historic Francavilla Calcio. In that year it won the Eccellenza Apulia championship coming back in Serie D.

From Serie D to Lega Pro 
In the season 2014–15 the team was promoted for the first time, from Eccellenza Apulia to Serie D. At the end of the 2015–16 Serie D, the team was promoted in the 2016–17 Lega Pro. For the first time in its history, the team reached a professional league, the third highest football division of Italy.

Colors and badge 
The team's main colors are blue and white.

Current squad
.

Out on loan

Honours 

 Coppa Italia Dilettanti:
Champion : 2014–15

References

External links
 Virtus Francavilla official website

Football clubs in Apulia
Francavilla Fontana
Association football clubs established in 2007
Association football clubs established in 1946
2007 establishments in Italy